Caitlin Elizabeth O'Connell-Rodwell is an instructor at Harvard Medical School, scientific consultant, author, co-founder and CEO of Utopia Scientific, and an expert on elephants. Her elephant research was the subject of the Elephant King, an award-winning Smithsonian Channel documentary.

Education and career 
Caitlin O’Connell received her B.Sc. in biology at Fairfield University in 1987 with a minor in French and art history and in 1991 her M.Sc. at the University of Hawaii at Manoa in ecology, evolution and conservation biology, involving research on seismo-acoustic communication of planthoppers.

In the course of three-year government contract involving efforts to mitigate conflicts between farmers and African elephant, she observed that also the elephants performed seismo-acoustic communication. Based on five years of experiments with captive elephants in the United States, Zimbabwe and India, she earned her Ph.D. in ecology at the University of California, Davis in 2000. She has subsequently worked at Stanford University Medical School as postdoctoral fellow, as assistant professor and (currently) as instructor at its Department of Otolaryngology.

In October 2002, together with Timothy Rodwell, she founded Utopia Scientific, a non‐profit corporation in San Diego that is dedicated to science and public health education. In spring 2013 she joined Georgia College as the inaugural Martha Daniel Newell Visiting Distinguished Scholar.

O'Connell's work has focused on elephant communication and elephant societies. At Stanford's Department of Otolaryngology, she investigated the possibility of developing a vibrotactile hearing aid inspired by her studies of the elephant vibrotactile sense, including the hearing-impaired and the profoundly deaf. Currently, she is funded by a National Institutes of Health grant to investigate the elephant middle ear and bone conduction hearing in relation to human hearing and bone conduction hearing aids  (For related approaches, see: Sensory substitution.)

Awards
In October 2007 she was awarded the Distinguished Young Alumna Award of the University of California, Davis.

The book The elephant scientist, which she wrote together with Donna M. Jackson and for which she and her husband Timothy C. Rodwell provided the photographs, received the Sibert Medal in 2012.

She received the Outstanding Science Trade Book award 2012 and the Junior Library Guild Selection 2011.

Publications
Caitlin O'Connell(-Rodwell) is author of numerous peer-reviewed articles and several popular science books.

Academic books:
 The Use of Vibrations in Communication: properties, mechanisms and function across taxa, Research Signpost, 2010, .

Popular science books:
Wild Rituals, Chronicle Prism, San Francisco, 2021
Elephant don: the politics of a pachyderm posse, University of Chicago Press, Chicago, 2015 
with Timothy C. Rodwell: A baby elephant in the wild, Houghton Mifflin Harcourt Publishing Company, New York, 2014
with Timothy C. Rodwell: An elephant's life: an intimate portrait from Africa, Lyons Press, 2012
with Donna M. Jackson and Timothy C. Rodwell: The elephant scientist, Houghton Mifflin Books for Children, 2011
The elephant's secret sense : the hidden life of the wild herds of Africa, Free Press, New York, 2007

She has published numerous contributions in the media, among others in Scientific American, National Geographic magazine, National Geographic Channel, Africa Geographic magazine, Discovery Channel, Discover Magazine, Science News, Fox Channel, BBC Online, The Writer and Smithsonian magazine.

References

External links
Websites on Caitlin O'Connell
 Caitlin E. O'Connell, personal website
 Utopia Scientific founders

Publications about Caitlin O'Connell-Rodwell:
 Melinda Sacks: What Makes Elephants Tick? A Stanford researcher unlocks some behavioral mysteries Stanford alumni, September/October 2009
 Cheryl Ernst: Understanding Elephants: UH scholars study wild and working animals on two continents, malamalama, May, 2007 Vol. 32 No. 2, University of Hawai'i System

Popular science reading and lectures by Caitlin O'Connell-Rodwell:
 Scientist at Work, New York Times
The meanest girls at the watering hole, Smithsonian.com, March 2013
The Secret Lives of Elephants: Caitlin O'Connell-Rodwell at TEDxStanford, TEDx Talks

Living people
American ecologists
Women ecologists
Women science writers
21st-century biologists
21st-century American women writers
Fairfield University alumni
University of Hawaiʻi at Mānoa alumni
University of California, Davis alumni
Stanford University School of Medicine faculty
American science writers
21st-century American scientists
Elephant conservation
American women non-fiction writers
21st-century American non-fiction writers
Year of birth missing (living people)